Huo Jianqi (born January 20, 1958) is a Chinese film director. Like the cinematographer turned director Gu Changwei, Huo Jianqi began his cinematic career in the art department. Nearly all of Huo's films have been written by his wife and collaborator, Qiu Shi, who works under the name "Si Wu." Unlike many of his contemporaries (and predecessors), Huo rarely has had issues with the Chinese government regarding his films, leading some western critics to label him the "darling director of China's film bureaucracy."

Career 
Huo attended the Beijing Film Academy in the early 1980s as part of the "Fifth Generation" (which also included directors like Zhang Yimou and Chen Kaige).  After graduation, he worked as an art director, including on films such as Tian Zhuangzhuang's The Horse Thief (1986). Huo's own career as a director did not begin, however, until 1995 with The Winner and would not achieve true international success until his 1999 film, Postmen in the Mountains. The simple tale of a father and son traveling through the mountains of Hunan delivering mail proved a success in both China, where it eventually won the Golden Rooster for best film, best director, and best actor Teng Rujun, and abroad in foreign festivals. Upon its release in the United States, the film was praised by critics for its sincerity, critic Roger Ebert noted that the film was "so simple and straightforward that its buried emotions catch us a little by surprise." Huo repeated that film's success with his subsequent project, including 2000's A Love of Blueness and 2002's Life Show (which won the Golden Goblet for best film at the Shanghai International Film Festival).

Huo scored another success with his adaptation of author Mo Yan's The White Dog and the Swing, entitled Nuan. The film, starring Guo Xiaodong and Li Jia in the titular role, won the Grand Prix at the Tokyo International Film Festival, as well as another best picture Golden Rooster.

Filmography

References

External links

Huo Jianqi at the Chinese Movie Database
Huo Jianqi at Cinemasie

Film directors from Beijing
Beijing Film Academy alumni
Art directors
1958 births
Living people